Adamstown Heights is a southern suburb of Newcastle, New South Wales, Australia, located  west-southwest of Newcastle's central business district along the Pacific Highway. It is split between the City of Lake Macquarie and City of Newcastle local government areas. On 6 September 1991 Adamstown heights officially become a suburb of Newcastle.

The Awabakal are the traditional people of this area.

The suburb contains two schools, Kotara High School, established in 1968 and containing 3 hectares of native bushland, and also established in 1968 Belair Public School. The suburb is served by Westfield Kotara shopping centre, formerly Garden City Kotara, and originally Kotara Fair, on its northern border.

Adamstown Heights is located on several bus routes and is near two railway stations on the Central Coast & Newcastle Line, Kotara and Adamstown.

Adamstown Heights had a population of 5,299 in 2016.

References

External links
 History of Adamstown Heights

Suburbs of Lake Macquarie
Suburbs of Newcastle, New South Wales